The Green is a 2011 drama film directed by Steven Williford, written by Williford, Paul Marcarelli and Molly Pearson, and starring Jason Butler Harner, Cheyenne Jackson, Illeana Douglas and Julia Ormond.

Plot
Michael Gavin and his partner Daniel trade the rat race of New York City for the idyllic charm of the Connecticut shoreline, with hopes of a simpler life and time for Michael to finish his first novel. All that changes when one of Michael's high school students accuses him of 'inappropriate conduct', and the town rushes to judgment.

Cast
 Jason Butler Harner as Michael Gavin
 Cheyenne Jackson as Daniel
 Illeana Douglas as Trish
 Julia Ormond as Karen
 Christopher Bert as Jason
 Karen Young as Janette
 Clayton Fox as Brad
 Bill Sage as Leo

References

External links
 
 
 

2011 films
2011 drama films
American drama films
American LGBT-related films
Films set in Connecticut
Films shot in Connecticut
American independent films
2011 LGBT-related films
LGBT-related drama films
2011 independent films
2010s English-language films
2010s American films